The Tour of Thailand, officially the Princess Maha Chakri Sirindhon's Cup Tour of Thailand is an annual professional road bicycle racing stage race held in Thailand. It was classified by the International Cycling Union as a 2.2 category race as part of the UCI Asia Tour, becoming rated category 2.1 since 2017.

Past winners

Men's race

Women's race

References

External links
 Tour of Thailand
 
 Statistics at the-sports.org
 Tour de Thailand at cqranking.com

Cycle races in Thailand
UCI Asia Tour races
Recurring sporting events established in 2006
2006 establishments in Thailand